Mario Tovar González (15 August 1933 – 15 December 2011) was a Mexican wrestler who competed at five Olympic Games from 1952 to 1968. At the Pan American Games Tovar won a silver medal in lightweight freestyle in 1959, and bronze medals in 1955 lightweight freestyle and 1963 featherweight freestyle.

References

External links
Mario Tovar González's profile at Sports Reference.com

1933 births
2011 deaths
Sportspeople from Mexico City
Wrestlers at the 1952 Summer Olympics
Wrestlers at the 1956 Summer Olympics
Wrestlers at the 1960 Summer Olympics
Wrestlers at the 1964 Summer Olympics
Wrestlers at the 1968 Summer Olympics
Mexican male sport wrestlers
Olympic wrestlers of Mexico
Pan American Games silver medalists for Mexico
Pan American Games bronze medalists for Mexico
Pan American Games medalists in wrestling
Deaths from respiratory failure
Wrestlers at the 1959 Pan American Games
Medalists at the 1955 Pan American Games
Medalists at the 1959 Pan American Games
Medalists at the 1963 Pan American Games
20th-century Mexican people
21st-century Mexican people